van Zeeland is a Dutch surname meaning "from Zeeland". Notable people with the surname include:

Ashley Van Zeeland, American neuroscientist
Hans van Zeeland (born 1954), Dutch water polo player
Paul van Zeeland (1893–1973), Belgian lawyer, politician and economist

Dutch-language surnames
Surnames of Dutch origin